Ntombovuyo Silberose Nkopane is a South African politician. Since 2014, she has been a member of the Eastern Cape Provincial Legislature, representing the African National Congress. On 16 August 2022, she was appointed as the Member of the Executive Council (MEC) responsible for the Public Works and Infrastructure portfolio.

References

External links

Living people
Members of the Eastern Cape Provincial Legislature
African National Congress politicians
Xhosa people
People from the Eastern Cape
Year of birth missing (living people)
Place of birth missing (living people)
Women members of provincial legislatures of South Africa